A numerical-value equation is an equation between quantities in which just the values of the quantities occurs but not the unit of measurement. Therefore, the equation requires to be used with the values the quantity has in a specific unit. A numerical value equation always has to be marked as such. 

Numerical value equations are in contrast to quantity equations. Quantity equations hold independently of the unit used to express the value of the quantity.

For example, a quantity equation for displacement d as speed s multiplied by time difference t would be:
d=s t
for s=5m/s and t and d in any units.
In contrast, a numerical-value equation would be:
D=5 T
for T in seconds and D in metres.

Generally, the use of numerical value equations is discouraged.

See also 
Dimensional analysis

References 

Physical quantities